This is a list of American television-related events in 1952.

Events

Other notable events in 1952
The FCC reserves some channels for non-commercial, educational broadcasting. 
The first political advertisements appear on television. The Democratic Party buys a 30-minute time segment for their candidate, Adlai Stevenson, who eventually received unfavorable mail for interfering with a broadcast of I Love Lucy. Dwight Eisenhower buys 20 second commercial segments and wins the election.

Television programs

Debuts

Changes of network affiliation

Ending this year

Television stations

Station launches

Network affiliation changes

Station closures

Births

Deaths

References

External links
List of 1952 American television series at IMDb

Sources